Luis Weihmüller (5 August 1902 – 1963) was an Argentine footballer. He was part of Argentina's squad for the 1928 Summer Olympics, but he did not play in any matches.

Early life
Weihmüller was born and lived his first years in San Carlos Centro, Argentina. He was born in 1902 (according to his family on the  5 August). He was the son of Swiss immigrants. As a child everyone called him "Sity".

The 1928 Olympics
Prior to the 1928 Olympics, Luis F. Weihmüller was summoned to join the Argentinian squad that had a number of players who would star two years later in the 1930 World Cup played in Uruguay. The strange thing was that, in those years, managers were not allowed in the rules to replace a player with  another. Anyway, as a member of that squad, Weihmüller won a silver medal. In the Argentine squad, there were five other players from Sportivo Palermo, which was Weihmüller's current team: Fernando Paternoster, Adolfo Zumelzu, Ludovico Bidoglio, Herman, and Juan Evaristo.

References

External links
 https://web.archive.org/web/20150623215531/http://www.eldiariocba.com.ar/noticias/nota.asp?nid=53354
 https://web.archive.org/web/20160804215331/http://anteriores2.eldiariocba.com.ar/noticias/nota.asp?nid=53354

1902 births
1963 deaths
Argentine footballers
Medalists at the 1928 Summer Olympics
Olympic silver medalists for Argentina
Association football defenders
Footballers at the 1928 Summer Olympics
Argentine people of German descent
People from Villa María
Sportspeople from Córdoba Province, Argentina